Park Place on Peachtree is a 420 ft (128m) tall skyscraper in Buckhead, Atlanta, Georgia. It was completed in 1986 and has 40 floors. It is the 27th tallest building in Atlanta. The skyscraper, developed and managed by The Brickstone Companies, houses 294 condominium units. Famous occupants of the building include or have included Elton John, Oprah Winfrey, Janet Jackson and Coretta Scott King.

See also
List of tallest buildings in Atlanta

References

External links
Emporis
Skyscraperpage

Residential skyscrapers in Atlanta
Residential buildings completed in 1986
Residential condominiums in the United States